The 122nd Brigade was a formation of  the British Army during the First World War.

History 

The 122nd Brigade was raised as part of the New Army also known as Kitchener's Army, and assigned to the 41st Division.

1916 
On 15 September 1916, troops of the 122nd Brigade, led by a Mark I tank, entered the eastern part of Flers on the Somme and took part in the Battle of Flers-Courcelette. This was the first time tanks had been deployed on the Western Front. The village of Flers itself was taken by the 122nd Brigade which had a total casualty roll of 1,200 out of 1,800 who went into action.

1918 
The 122nd Brigade also fought in the Battle of the Lys and the Escaut.

Formation
12th Battalion, East Surrey Regiment (Bermondsey)
15th Battalion, Hampshire Regiment (2nd Portsmouth)
11th Battalion, Royal West Kent Regiment (Lewisham), disbanded in March 1918
18th Battalion, King's Royal Rifle Corps (Arts and Crafts)
122nd Machine Gun Company, from May 1916 to March 1918
122nd Trench Mortar Battery, from June 1916

Official sources

War diaries 

 The National Archives of the UK (TNA): WO 95/2632/1 (01/05/1916–31/07/1916)
 The National Archives of the UK (TNA): WO 95/2632/2 (01/08/1916–30/09/1916)
 The National Archives of the UK (TNA): WO 95/2632/3 (01/10/1916–31/10/1916)
 The National Archives of the UK (TNA): WO 95/2632/4 (01/11/1916–31/12/1916)
 The National Archives of the UK (TNA): WO 95/2632/5 (01/01/1917–30/04/1917)
 The National Archives of the UK (TNA): WO 95/2632/6 (01/05/1917–30/06/1917)
 The National Archives of the UK (TNA): WO 95/2633/1 (01/07/1917–31/10/1917)
 The National Archives of the UK (TNA): WO 95/2633/2 (01/03/1918–31/10/1919)
 The National Archives of the UK (TNA): WO 95/4243 (01/11/1917–28/02/1918)

See also 

 British infantry brigades of the First World War

References

Infantry brigades of the British Army in World War I